Enigmaticolus is a genus of sea snails, marine gastropod mollusks in the family Eosiphonidae, the true whelks and their allies.

Species
Species within the genus Enigmaticolus include:
 Enigmaticolus desbruyeresi '(Okutani & Ohta, 1993) ' Enigmaticolus marshalli Fraussen & Stahlschmidt, 2016

 Enigmaticolus nipponensis '(Okutani & Fujiwara, 2000) 
 Enigmaticolus voluptarius Fraussen & Stahlschmidt, 2016
Synonyms
 Enigmaticolus auzendei (A. Warén & P. Bouchet, 2001): synonym of Thermosipho auzendei (A. Warén & P. Bouchet, 2001) 
 Enigmaticolus inflatus S.-Q. Zhang, S.-P. Zhang & H. Chen, 2020: synonym of Enigmaticolus nipponensis (Okutani & Fujiwara, 2000)
 Enigmaticolus monnieri Fraussen, 2008: synonym of Enigmaticolus nipponensis'' (Okutani & Fujiwara, 2000)

References

 Fraussen K. 2008. Enigmaticolus, a new genus of deep water buccinids (Gastropoda: Buccinidae) with description of a new species from Madagascar. Gloria Maris, 46(4-5): 74-82
 Fraussen, K.; Stahlschmidt, P. (2016). The extensive Indo-Pacific deep-water radiation of Manaria E.A. Smith, 1906 (Gastropoda: Buccinidae) and related genera, with descriptions of 21 new species. in: Héros, V. et al. (Ed.) Tropical Deep-Sea Benthos 29. Mémoires du Muséum national d'Histoire naturelle (1993). 208: 363-456.

External links
 Kantor Yu.I., Puillandre N., Fraussen K., Fedosov A.E. & Bouchet P. (2013) Deep-water Buccinidae (Gastropoda: Neogastropoda) from sunken wood, vents and seeps: Molecular phylogeny and taxonomy. Journal of the Marine Biological Association of the United Kingdom, 93(8): 2177-2195

Eosiphonidae
Monotypic gastropod genera